Givi Kvaratskhelia (born 11 May 1979) is a retired Georgian footballer.

In 2010, he moved from FC Dinamo Brest in Belarus. He has also played for Torpedo Kutaisi, Skonto Riga, FC Lokomotivi Tbilisi, FC Tbilisi, FC Olimpi Rustavi and MTZ-RIPO Minsk.

References

External links

1979 births
Living people
Footballers from Tbilisi
Footballers from Georgia (country)
Association football midfielders
Expatriate footballers from Georgia (country)
Georgia (country) international footballers
Expatriate footballers in Latvia
Expatriate footballers in Lithuania
Expatriate footballers in Belarus
Expatriate sportspeople from Georgia (country) in Latvia
FC Dinamo Tbilisi players
FC Tbilisi players
FC Lokomotivi Tbilisi players
Skonto FC players
FC Torpedo Kutaisi players
FBK Kaunas footballers
FC Metalurgi Rustavi players
FC Partizan Minsk players
FC Dynamo Brest players
FC Spartaki Tskhinvali players
FC Chikhura Sachkhere players
FC Sioni Bolnisi players
Expatriate sportspeople from Georgia (country) in Lithuania
Expatriate sportspeople from Georgia (country) in Belarus
Erovnuli Liga players